Easter hymns are hymns dedicated to Eastertide, related to the resurrection of Jesus.

List of Easter hymns 

 
Holiday songs lists